Derby–Disraeli ministry may refer to three ministries of the United Kingdom of Great Britain and Ireland:

* First Derby–Disraeli ministry, the British government under Lord Derby and Benjamin Disraeli (February–December 1852)
 Second Derby–Disraeli ministry, the British government under Lord Derby and Benjamin Disraeli (1858–1859)
 Third Derby–Disraeli ministry, the British government under Lord Derby and Benjamin Disraeli (1866–1868)

See also
 Derby ministry (disambiguation)
 Disraeli ministry (disambiguation)